Portia Bing (born 17 April 1993 in Helensville) is a New Zealand athlete who specialises in the heptathlon. She competed at the 2015 World Championships in Athletics in Beijing, China finishing sixteenth. Her heptathlon personal best is 6102 points set in Brisbane in 2015.

Competition record

Personal bests
Outdoor

References

External links
 
 

1993 births
Living people
New Zealand heptathletes
New Zealand female athletes
World Athletics Championships athletes for New Zealand
Commonwealth Games competitors for New Zealand
Athletes (track and field) at the 2014 Commonwealth Games
Athletes (track and field) at the 2022 Commonwealth Games
Sportspeople from the Auckland Region
People from Helensville
20th-century New Zealand women
21st-century New Zealand women
New Zealand female hurdlers